Mihail Drobov (Bulgarian: Михаил Дробов), known as Milko Kalaidjiev (Bulgarian: Милко Калайджиев) is the first Bulgarian singer signed to the Payner label. He was born on 23 September 1951 in Svilengrad, Bulgaria.

Personal life
Milko has three children. His eldest son works as a lawyer in Sofia. His twins, Aleks and Antonio (born 1987), are from his wife Margarita. He works as a farmer and a businessman.

In 2019, he ran as a mayor for the Svilengrad Municipality from Movement for Rights and Freedoms (DPS) in the 2019 Bulgarian local elections and gained 4% of the vote.

Albums
1996 - Има ли Господ? (Is there a God?) 

1997 - Прошка (Forgiveness)
1998 - Спомен за обич (Memory of love)
1999 - Най-доброто (The Best)
2000 - GSM
2001 - Софиянка (Woman from Sofia)
2002 - Тарикат и тарикатка (Wiseguy and wisewoman)
2002 - Европеец - произведено в България (European - Made in Bulgaria)
2003 - Танцувай с мен (Dance with me)
2004 - Десетият (The Tenth)
2013 - Кръчма е душата ми ("My soul is a pub")

Foreign performances
Milko has performed in North Macedonia, Israel, United States, Albania, Turkey, Netherlands, Greece, Cyprus and Canada.

Producer
As a singer, Milko discovered the famous Bulgarian pop-folk singers Preslava, Galena, Мira, Anelia, Emilia, Dzhena and others.

Honors
Duet of the year (Hey, the little) with Mira - 2003 (Planeta TV Bulgaria)
Song of the year 2009 (Planeta TV Bulgaria)

References

External links
 Milko on Payner
 2019 Local elections results in the Svilengrad Mulnicipality

1951 births
20th-century Bulgarian male singers
Bulgarian folk-pop singers
Living people
Payner artists
21st-century Bulgarian male singers